In multitasking computer operating systems, a daemon ( or ) is a computer program that runs as a background process, rather than being under the direct control of an interactive user. Traditionally, the process names of a daemon end with the letter d, for clarification that the process is in fact a daemon, and for differentiation between a daemon and a normal computer program.

In a Unix environment, the parent process of a daemon is often, but not always, the init process. A daemon is usually created either by a process forking a child process and then immediately exiting, thus causing init to adopt the child process, or by the init process directly launching the daemon. In addition, a daemon launched by forking and exiting typically must perform other operations, such as dissociating the process from any controlling terminal (tty). Such procedures are often implemented in various convenience routines such as daemon(3) in Unix.

Systems often start daemons at boot time that will respond to network requests, hardware activity, or other programs by performing some task. Daemons such as cron may also perform defined tasks at scheduled times.

Terminology
The term was coined by the programmers at MIT's Project MAC. According to Fernando J. Corbató, who worked on Project MAC in 1963, his team was the first to use the term daemon, inspired by Maxwell's demon, an imaginary agent in physics and thermodynamics that helped to sort molecules, stating, "We fancifully began to use the word daemon to describe background processes that worked tirelessly to perform system chores". Unix systems inherited this terminology.  Maxwell's demon is consistent with Greek mythology's interpretation of a daemon as a supernatural being working in the background.

In the general sense, daemon is an older form of the word "demon", from the Greek δαίμων. In the Unix System Administration Handbook Evi Nemeth states the following about daemons:

A further characterization of the mythological symbolism is that a daemon is something that is not visible yet is always present and working its will. In the Theages, attributed to Plato, Socrates describes his own personal daemon to be something like the modern concept of a moral conscience: "The favour of the gods has given me a marvelous gift, which has never left me since my childhood. It is a voice that, when it makes itself heard, deters me from what I am about to do and never urges me on".

In modern usage, the word daemon is pronounced  .

Alternative terms for daemon are service (used in Windows, from Windows NT onwards, and later also in Linux), started task (IBM z/OS), and ghost job (XDS UTS).

After the term was adopted for computer use, it was rationalized as a backronym for Disk And Execution MONitor.

Daemons that connect to a computer network are examples of network services.

Implementations

Unix-like systems
In a strictly technical sense, a Unix-like system process is a daemon when its parent process terminates and the daemon is assigned the init process (process number 1) as its parent process and has no controlling terminal. However, more generally, a daemon may be any background process, whether a child of the init process or not.

On a Unix-like system, the common method for a process to become a daemon, when the process is started from the command line or from a startup script such as an init script or a SystemStarter script, involves:
 Optionally removing unnecessary variables from environment.
 Executing as a background task by forking and exiting (in the parent "half" of the fork). This allows daemon's parent (shell or startup process) to receive exit notification and continue its normal execution.
 Detaching from the invoking session, usually accomplished by a single operation, setsid():
 Dissociating from the controlling tty.
 Creating a new session and becoming the session leader of that session.
 Becoming a process group leader.
 If the daemon wants to ensure that it will not acquire a new controlling tty even by accident (which happens when a session leader without a controlling tty opens a free tty), it may fork and exit again. This means that it is no longer a session leader in the new session, and cannot acquire a controlling tty.
 Setting the root directory as the current working directory so that the process does not keep any directory in use that may be on a mounted file system (allowing it to be unmounted).
 Changing the umask to 0 to allow open(), creat(), and other operating system calls to provide their own permission masks and not to depend on the umask of the caller.

MS-DOS
In the Microsoft DOS environment, daemon-like programs were implemented as terminate-and-stay-resident programs (TSR).

Windows NT
On Microsoft Windows NT systems, programs called Windows services perform the functions of daemons. They run as processes, usually do not interact with the monitor, keyboard, and mouse, and may be launched by the operating system at boot time.

However, any Windows application can perform the role of a daemon, not just a service, and some Windows daemons have the option of running as a normal process.

Classic Mac OS and macOS
On the classic Mac OS, optional features and services were provided by files loaded at startup time that patched the operating system; these were known as system extensions and control panels. Later versions of classic Mac OS augmented these with fully fledged faceless background applications: regular applications that ran in the background. To the user, these were still described as regular system extensions.

macOS, which is a Unix system, uses daemons but uses the term "services" to designate software that performs functions selected from the Services menu, rather than using that term for daemons, as Windows does.

See also

 List of computer term etymologies
 List of Unix daemons
 Service wrapper
 Software bot
 User space
 Web service
 Windows service

References

External links
 
 Linux Daemon Writing HOWTO

Process (computing)
Servers (computing)